Goodbye Jumbo is the second studio album by British alternative rock band World Party, released on 24 April 1990 on Ensign Records.

The album received generally positive reviews from critics and peaked at No. 73 on the US Billboard 200 and No. 36 on the UK Albums Chart. "Way Down Now", the album's lead single, spent five weeks at number one on the Billboard Alternative Songs chart, and follow-up single "Put the Message in the Box" reached No. 8.

Critical reception

In a contemporary review for the Chicago Tribune, Greg Kot noted heavy influence from The Beatles in the album's "sense of pop and studio craft" and wrote that the biting humor and irony expressed in Wallinger's lyrics was balanced out by "memorable melodies and moments", calling all the album's songs "worth savoring." Chris Willman of the Los Angeles Times felt that his "Lennonisms sound somehow endemic, not affected" and the wide range of musical influences on Goodbye Jumbo did not constitute "petty theft", stating that the album "comes together marvelously." Don McLeese of Rolling Stone wrote that Goodbye Jumbo "displays an ambition as broad as the emotional range of its music" and that while Wallinger's "missionary zeal occasionally belabors his messages", the album's music is "sufficiently vital to overpower resistance". Spins Jon Young dubbed it as a "winning opus". One detractor was Robert Christgau of The Village Voice, who assigned the album a "dud" rating, indicating "a bad record whose details rarely merit further thought".

Goodbye Jumbo was named the fifteenth best album of 1990 in The Village Voices year-end Pazz & Jop critics' poll. It was named as Album of the Year by Q in 1990, with the album also receiving a nomination for a Grammy Award for Best Alternative Music Album the same year. In 2000, Q placed it at number 94 in its list of the 100 Greatest British Albums Ever.

In 2000 it was voted number 474 in Colin Larkin's All Time Top 1000 Albums.

Track listing
All songs written and composed by Karl Wallinger.

 "Is It Too Late?" – 4:24
 "Way Down Now" – 3:49
 "When the Rainbow Comes" – 4:58
 "Put the Message in the Box" – 4:16
 "Ain't Gonna Come Till I'm Ready" – 5:05
 "And I Fell Back Alone" – 3:57
 "Take It Up" – 4:37
 "God on My Side" – 4:14
 "Show Me to the Top" – 5:15 
 "Love Street" – 4:21
 "Sweet Soul Dream" – 4:39
 "Thank You World" – 3:47

Personnel
Credits for Goodbye Jumbo adapted from album liner notes.

Musicians
 Karl Wallinger – vocals, all instruments (except as indicated), composition, design, engineering, production
 Guy Chambers – drum samples (1), synthesizer (3,4,9,10), sampler (4), backwards piano (5), acoustic piano (10), harmonium (11), 
 Chris Sharrock - drum kit (2, 3, 4)
 Jeff Trott – slide guitar (1,3), electric guitar (2), 12-string acoustic guitar (3)
 Jerod Minnies – acoustic guitar (1)
 Martyn Swain - bass guitar (10)
 Chris Whitten – drum kit (1,5)
 Steve Wickham – violin (7)
 Roy Morgan – tambourine (2)
 Dave Catlin-Birch - guitar (6,7)
 Sophia Ramos – backing vocals (3)
 Sinéad O'Connor – backing vocals (11)

Additional personnel
 Joe Blaney – engineering
 Karl Wallinger and Stephanie Nash – artwork
 Steven Fargnoli – management
 Karl Wallinger and Michael Nash – design
 Steve Wallace – photography
 Tim Young – digital editing, mastering

Charts

References

External links

1990 albums
World Party albums